Walt Williams (born  7 May 1985) is a Grenadian retired track and field athlete who specialized in the throwing events. On April 28, 2007 he threw the shot put a distance of 17.26 m, in the process setting a national record. He won medals at the CARIFTA Games in both discus and shot put from 2000 to 2004. He represented Grenada at the 2006 NACAC Under-23 Championships in Athletics, finishing in fifth place.

In 2016 he launched a sporting club in order to develop athletes with the aim of having them qualify for the 2020 summer olympics.

Competition record

References

External links

1985 births
Living people
Male shot putters
Grenadian male athletes